In the Evenings Out There is an album by pianist Paul Bley, bassist Gary Peacock, drummer Tony Oxley and saxophonist John Surman recorded in 1991 and released on the ECM label in 1993.

Reception 

The AllMusic review by David R. Adler stated: "This is a remarkable encounter between four top-notch musicians... Although the record falls solidly within the "free jazz" category, it has a mysteriously soothing, meditative quality. Fans of these four greats shouldn't miss it".  The Penguin Guide to Jazz wrote: "The music is entirely collaborative and there are solo tracks, duos, and trios, with only one substantial group track, so the emphasis is on intimate communication across small but significant musical distances".

Track listing
All compositions by Paul Bley except as indicated
 "Afterthoughts" - 4:05 
 "Portrait of a Silence" (Gary Peacock) - 5:58 
 "Soft Touch" (Bley, Tony Oxley) - 3:42 
 "Speak Easy" (Oxley, Peacock) - 2:47 
 "Interface" (Bley, Oxley, Peacock, John Surman) - 5:22 
 "Alignment" (Surman) - 3:50 
 "Fair Share" (Bley, Peacock) - 6:03 
 "Article Four" (Surman) - 8:28 
 "Married Alive" - 4:17 
 "Spe-Cu-Lay-Ting" (Bley, Oxley) - 1:26 
 "Tomorrow Today" (Peacock) - 2:19 
 "Note Police" - 7:54 
Recorded at Rainbow Studio in Oslo, Norway in September 1991.

Personnel
 Paul Bley — piano 
 John Surman — soprano saxophone, bass clarinet 
 Gary Peacock — bass  
 Tony Oxley — drums

References

ECM Records albums
Paul Bley albums
1993 albums
Albums produced by Manfred Eicher